is a passenger railway station in located in the city of Nabari,  Mie Prefecture, Japan, operated by the private railway operator Kintetsu Railway.

Lines
Nabari Station is served by the Osaka Line, and is located 67.2 rail kilometers from the starting point of the line at Ōsaka Uehommachi Station.

Station layout
The station consists of two island platform serving four ground-level tracks, connect by an underground passage.

Platforms

Adjacent stations

History
Nabari Station opened on October 10, 1930 as a station on the Sangu Express Electric Railway. After merging with Osaka Electric Kido on March 15, 1941, the line became the Kansai Express Railway's Osaka Line. This line was merged with the Nankai Electric Railway on June 1, 1944 to form Kintetsu.

Passenger statistics
In fiscal 2019, the station was used by an average of 5910 passengers daily (boarding passengers only).

Surrounding area
Mie Prefectural Nabari High School
Nabari Post Office
Nabari City Library

See also
List of railway stations in Japan

References

External links

Kintetsu: Nabari Station 

Railway stations in Japan opened in 1930
Railway stations in Mie Prefecture
Stations of Kintetsu Railway
Nabari, Mie